The FIA Motorsport Games Karting Slalom Cup was the first FIA Motorsport Games Karting Slalom Cup, to be held at ACI Vallelunga Circuit, Italy on 1 November to 3 November 2019. The race will be contested with identical electric-powered karts  The event was the part of the 2019 FIA Motorsport Games. 

Drivers raced around the cones, receiving penalty seconds for every cone knocked off.

Entry List
All entered drivers aged between 14 and 16 and competed with identical electric-powered karts.

Qualifying
Drivers qualified for the 1/16 highlighted in green.

Knock-out stages and final

References

External links

Karting Slalom Cup
Kart racing events